Elizabeth Ward may refer to:

Actresses
Elizabeth Gracen (born 1961), American actress, born Elizabeth Ward, Miss America 1982
Elizabeth Ward (actress), American actress in Alone in the Dark
Betty Ward (born 1944), actress
Beth Ward, presenter of quiz show As Schools Match Wits since 2008

Others
Elizabeth Rebecca Ward (1880–1978), English writer
Elizabeth Stuart Phelps Ward (1844–1911), American author
Elizabeth Ward (critic), winner of National Book Critics Circle Award in 1992
Elizabeth M. Ward, American scientist and researcher
Liz Ward (artist), American artist